Bogi Løkin (born 22 October 1988) is a Faroese footballer and former poet who plays for Faroese club ÍF Fuglafjørður.

Bogi Løkin is the son of former Faroese international midfielder Abraham Løkin, who is the former coach of ÍF Fuglafjørður. His younger brothers, Karl Løkin and Steffan Løkin, is also footballers.

Club career
Bogi Løkin began his career at NSÍ Runavík and made over 100 appearances for the club before he turned 21. In 2010, he joined BK Frem midway through the Danish season. At the end of the season he chose to go back to the Faroe Islands for summer 2010, joining his former club NSÍ Runavík. In 2011, he joined ÍF Fuglafjørður. He left the club again at the end of 2012.

After leaving ÍF Fuglafjørður, Løkin moved abroad. He returned to ÍF Fuglafjørður in July 2014. In 2020 he made a return to ÍF Fuglafjørður, where he  had a warm welcome from the ÍF ultras, as a tifo was prepeared in his honor. Løkin is seen by many to be the greatest footballer to play for ÍF

International career
He played for the Faroe Islands national team and he has scored one goal.
He scored an international goal for the Faroe Islands on 11 October 2008 in their 1–1 draw against Austria in a qualifying match for the 2010 FIFA World Cup.

International goals
Scores and results list Faroe Islands' goal tally first.

References

External links

Living people
1989 births
People from Runavík
Faroese footballers
Faroese expatriate footballers
Faroe Islands international footballers
NSÍ Runavík players
Boldklubben Frem players
ÍF Fuglafjørður players
Association football midfielders
Expatriate men's footballers in Denmark
Faroe Islands Premier League players
1. deild karla players
2. deild karla players
3. deild karla players
Danish 1st Division players